Lambeth North may refer to:

 Lambeth North tube station, a London Underground station
 Lambeth (UK Parliament constituency) (1832–1885)
 Lambeth North (UK Parliament constituency) (1885–1950)
 North Lambeth